The Municipal Borough of Ipswich was created in 1835 by the Municipal Corporations Act 1835. It was the form of local government for the ancient borough of Ipswich until the Local Government Act 1888 replaced it with the County Borough of Ipswich in 1889. Both originated from the ancient borough of Ipswich. The local authority was Ipswich Corporation. Following the passage of the Reform Act 1832, the government set up a Royal Commission in July 1833 to investigate how local councils worked. In 1974 it was replaced by the non-metropolitan district of Ipswich and Ipswich Borough Council became the local authority, with county council duties fulfilled by Suffolk County Council.

Following the Local Government Act 1888, the county of Suffolk outside of Ipswich was split into East Suffolk and West Suffolk for administrative purposes and the term administrative county was introduced. There was a level of continuity as Ipswich was still run by the Ipswich Corporation, independently from East Suffolk (which surrounded it), although the county council was based in Ipswich at East Suffolk County Hall.

In 1974 following the Local Government Act 1972 and Ipswich became a non-metropolitan district with borough status in the administrative county of Suffolk with the same boundaries as the county borough.

References

External links 
 Ipswich Borough Council

County boroughs of England
County Borough
Non-metropolitan districts of Suffolk